The Westphalian Museum of Natural History is a natural history museum in Münster, Germany.

Exhibits 

 Of coming and going - fauna from or once were from Westphalia
 Dinosaurs
 Survivalist human - About humanity
 Animally individual

See also 
List of museums in Germany
List of natural history museums

External links 

Natural history museums in Germany
Museums in Münster